Chastye is the name of several rural localities in Russia:
Chastye, Chastinsky District, Perm Krai, a selo in Chastinsky District of Perm Krai
Chastye, Kishertsky District, Perm Krai, a village in Kishertsky District of Perm Krai
Chastye, Pskov Oblast, a village in Kunyinsky District of Pskov Oblast